Neil Freeman may refer to:

 Neil Freeman (English footballer) (born 1955), English football goalkeeper
 Neil Mackenzie Freeman (1890–1961), senior officer of the Australian Army and Australian rules footballer